is a Japanese former figure skater. He attends Kansai University.

Competitive highlights

External links
 
https://www.jsfresults.com/

1989 births
Japanese male single skaters
Sportspeople from Osaka
Living people